Malta participated in the Eurovision Song Contest 2017 with the song "Breathlessly" written by Philip Vella, Sean Vella and Gerard James Borg. The song was performed by Claudia Faniello. The Maltese entry for the 2017 contest in Kyiv, Ukraine was selected through the national final Malta Eurovision Song Contest 2017, organised by the Maltese broadcaster Public Broadcasting Services (PBS). The competition consisted of a final, held on 18 February 2017, where "Breathlessly" performed by Claudia Faniello eventually emerged as the winning entry after gaining 26% of the public televote.

Malta was drawn to compete in the second semi-final of the Eurovision Song Contest which took place on 11 May 2017. Performing during the show in position 4, "Breathlessly" was not announced among the top 10 entries of the second semi-final and therefore did not qualify to compete in the final on 13 May. It was later revealed that Malta placed sixteenth out of the 18 participating countries in the semi-final with 55 points.

Background 

Prior to the 2017 contest, Malta had participated in the Eurovision Song Contest twenty-nine times since its first entry in 1971. Malta briefly competed in the Eurovision Song Contest in the 1970s before withdrawing for sixteen years. The country had, to this point, competed in every contest since returning in 1991. Malta's best placing in the contest thus far was second, which it achieved on two occasions: in 2002 with the song "7th Wonder" performed by Ira Losco and in the 2005 contest with the song "Angel" performed by Chiara. In the 2016 edition, Malta qualified to the final and placed 12th with the song "Walk on Water" performed by Ira Losco.

For the 2017 contest, the Maltese national broadcaster, Public Broadcasting Services (PBS), broadcast the event within Malta and organised the selection process for the nation's entry. PBS confirmed their intentions to participate at it on 17 August 2016. Malta selected their entry consistently through a national final procedure, a method that was continued for their 2017 participation.

Before Eurovision

Malta Eurovision Song Contest 2017
Malta Eurovision Song Contest 2017 was the national final format developed by PBS to select the Maltese entry for the Eurovision Song Contest 2017. The competition consisted of a final held on 18 February 2017 at the Malta Fairs and Conventions Centre in Ta' Qali, hosted by Daniel Azzopardi and Charlene Mercieca and broadcast on Television Malta (TVM) as well on the broadcaster's website tvm.com.mt.

Competing entries
Artists and composers were able to submit their entries on 30 November 2016 to the PBS Creativity Hub in Gwardamanġa. Songwriters from any nationality were able to submit songs as long as the artist were Maltese or possessed Maltese citizenship. Artists were able to submit as many songs as they wished, however, they could only compete with a maximum of one in the final. 2016 national final winner Ira Losco was unable to compete due to a rule that prevented the previous winner from competing in the following competition. 156 entries were received by the broadcaster. On 12 December 2016, PBS announced a shortlist of 60 entries that had progressed through the selection process. The sixteen songs selected to compete in the competition were announced on 21 December 2016.

Among the selected competing artists was former Maltese Eurovision entrant Richard Edwards who represented Malta in the 2014 contest as part of the group Firelight. Among the songwriters, Boris Cezek, Dean Muscat, Muxu, Gerard James Borg and Philip Vella were all past writers of Maltese Eurovision entries. Jonas Gladnikoff co-wrote the Irish entries in 2009, 2010 and 2014; Christian Schneider, Aidan O'Connor and Sara Biglert co-wrote the Czech entry in 2016.

Final 
The final took place on 18 February 2017. Sixteen entries competed and the winner was determined solely by a public televote. The interval act of the show featured performances by the 2016 Maltese Eurovision entrant Ira Losco, the 2016 Maltese Junior Eurovision entrant Christina Magrin and the local band The Travellers. After the results of the public televote were announced, "Breathlessly" performed by Claudia Faniello was the winner.

Promotion
Claudia Faniello made several appearances across Europe to specifically promote "Breathlessly" as the Maltese Eurovision entry. On 2 April, Faniello performed during the London Eurovision Party, which was held at the Café de Paris venue in London, United Kingdom and hosted by Nicki French. Between 3 and 6 April, she took part in promotional activities in Tel Aviv, Israel where she performed during the Israel Calling event held at the Ha'teatron venue. On 8 April, Claudia Faniello performed during the Eurovision in Concert event which was held at the Melkweg venue in Amsterdam, Netherlands and hosted by Cornald Maas and Selma Björnsdóttir.

At Eurovision
The Eurovision Song Contest 2017 took place at the International Exhibition Centre in Kyiv, Ukraine and consisted of two semi-finals on 9 and 11 May, and the final of 13 May 2017. According to Eurovision rules, all nations with the exceptions of the host country and the "Big Five" (France, Germany, Italy, Spain and the United Kingdom) are required to qualify from one of two semi-finals in order to compete for the final; the top ten countries from each semi-final progress to the final. The European Broadcasting Union (EBU) split up the competing countries into six different pots based on voting patterns from previous contests, with countries with favourable voting histories put into the same pot. On 31 January 2017, a special allocation draw was held which placed each country into one of the two semi-finals, as well as which half of the show they would perform in. Malta was placed into the first semi-final, to be held on 11 May 2017, and was scheduled to perform in the first half of the show.

Once all the competing songs for the 2017 contest had been released, the running order for the semi-finals was decided by the shows' producers rather than through another draw, so that similar songs were not placed next to each other. Originally, Malta was set to perform in position 5, following the entry from Macedonia and before the entry from Romania, however following Russia's withdrawal from the contest on 13 April and subsequent removal from the running order of the second semi-final, Malta's performing position shifted to 4.

The two semi-finals and the final were broadcast in Malta on TVM with commentary by disc jockey Arthur Caruana. The Maltese spokesperson, who announced the top 12 Points awarded by the Maltese jury during the final, was actor Ben Camille.

Semi-final

The Maltese performance featured Claudia Faniello wearing a glittery silver full-length tight-fitting formal dress, taking inspiration from her music video for "Breathlessly". The LED backdrops were mostly dark blue where Faniello appeared on the LED backdrop, sometimes with just a close-up of her face and sometimes with a full body shot. The chandelier was prominent, which was also taking inspiration from the setting of the music video. Claudia Faniello was joined by four off-stage backing vocalists: Chantal Hartmann, Hannah Köpf, Janina Krömer and Jeannette Marchewka.

At the end of the show, Malta was not announced as having finished in the top 10 and did not qualify for the grand final. It was later revealed that Malta placed sixteenth in the semi-final, receiving a total of 55 points: 0 points from the televoting and 55 points from the juries.

Voting 
Voting during the three shows involved each country awarding two sets of points from 1–8, 10 and 12: one from their professional jury and the other from televoting. Each nation's jury consisted of five music industry professionals who are citizens of the country they represent, with their names published before the contest to ensure transparency. This jury judged each entry based on: vocal capacity; the stage performance; the song's composition and originality; and the overall impression by the act. In addition, no member of a national jury was permitted to be related in any way to any of the competing acts in such a way that they cannot vote impartially and independently. The individual rankings of each jury member as well as the nation's televoting results were released shortly after the grand final.

Below is a breakdown of points awarded to Malta and awarded by Malta in the second semi-final and grand final of the contest, and the breakdown of the jury voting and televoting conducted during the two shows:

Points awarded to Malta

Points awarded by Malta

Detailed voting results
The following members comprised the Maltese jury:
 Kevin Abela (jury chairperson)principal of the Trumpet Malta Philharmonic Orchestra
 Whitney Cremonasinger
 Karl BonaciTV director
 Chiara Siracusasinger, represented Malta in the 1998, 2005 and 2009 contests
 Mark Spiteri Lucasteacher, musician, band leader, songwriter, arranger

References

2017
Countries in the Eurovision Song Contest 2017
Eurovision